Mount Edgecumbe may refer to:

Mountains

 Mount Edgecumbe (Alaska), a dormant volcano located on Kruzof Island in Alaska, USA
 Putauaki or Mount Edgecumbe, a volcanic cone in the Bay of Plenty Region of New Zealand
 Mount Edgecumbe (Southland) a mountain in Fiordland, New Zealand

Other places

 Mt. Edgecumbe High School, a boarding high school in Sitka, Alaska
 Mount Edgcumbe House in Cornwall, United Kingdom

See also
 Earl of Mount Edgcumbe
 Mount Edgecombe, a gated community in KwaZulu-Natal, South Africa